The Lazio regional election of 1995 took place on 23 April 1995.

For the first time the President of the Region was directly elected by the people, although the election was not yet binding and the President-elect could have been replaced during the term.

Piero Badaloni (an independent close to the Italian People's Party) was elected President of the region, defeating Alberto Michelini (Forza Italia) by a narrow margin.

Results

Elections in Lazio
1995 elections in Italy